This is a list of people executed in the United States in 2003. A total of sixty-five people, all male, were executed in the United States in 2003, sixty-four by lethal injection and one by electrocution.

List of people executed in the United States in 2003

Demographics

Executions in recent years

See also
 List of death row inmates in the United States
 List of most recent executions by jurisdiction
 List of people scheduled to be executed in the United States
 List of women executed in the United States since 1976

References

List of people executed in the United States
executed
People executed in the United States
2003